is a castle structure in Saiki, Ōita Prefecture, Japan. In 2017, the castle was listed as one of the Continued Top 100 Japanese Castles.

Literature

References

Castles in Ōita Prefecture
Historic Sites of Japan
Former castles in Japan